George Utley (16 May 1887 – 8 January 1966) was an English footballer who played for Barnsley, Sheffield United and England. He was strong and powerful half back who could shoot at goal when required.

Utley was born in Reform Row, Elsecar, which lies south of Barnsley. He was the 11th and final child of James and Mary Utley. His father was an engine tender at a colliery and his brothers worked in the local coal mines and foundries.

Club career

Barnsley
On leaving school he became a joiner, but by 1907 he had signed with Barnsley. During his time with Barnsley the club made it to two FA Cup Finals. The first was in 1910, when they were beaten by Newcastle United 2–0 in a reply after a one all draw, and the second was in 1912, when Barnsley managed to defeat West Bromwich Albion by one goal in the replay after the first game ended in a goalless draw.

He made a total of 170 league appearances, with 8 goals for Barnsley.

In season 1913–14, Sheffield United were looking for a replacement for Ernest Needham who had been a leader in the midfield of the team. The Football Committee who ran Sheffield United at the time were looking for a player with outstanding football ability, and someone to captain the team. Following a letter of recommendation from United player Billy Gillespie the man they targeted was George Utley.

Sheffield United

The committee were not unanimous about signing the highly rated Utley, who they feared would fetch a large fee. Bolton Wanderers had offered £1,500 and it had been rejected by Barnsley. The Blades offered more and were also turned down. United increased their offer to £2,000 and this was accepted, making him the most expensive player in Britain at the time. Utley signed a long contract with United, and became the captain and the leader of the team through the ensuing years.

He made his debut for Sheffield United against Manchester United at Bramall Lane on 22 November 1913; in a match the Blades won 2–0.

In the 1914–15 season, Sheffield United progressed through the rounds of the FA Cup, this improvement in United's Cup performance when compared to the previous seasons was credited to Utley. In the Semi-Final they beat Bolton Wanderers 2–1 on 27 March 1915. It included a goal by Utley, which was described as 'the best of his career' as he dribbled the ball from the half-way line to score for United in front of 22,500 fans. Utley made it to a third FA Cup Final in 1915, when Sheffield United defeated Chelsea 3–0 on 24 April 1915. Utley, as captain, worked hard and decisively throughout the game, breaking up many Chelsea attacks and provided many passes to the Sheffield forwards.

He left Bramall Lane in 1922, transferring to Manchester City but retired within twelve months of the move.

Coaching
After leaving Manchester City, Utley went on to hold the position of trainer at Bristol City before moving to Sheffield Wednesday in May 1924 to the position of coach. He then moved on to become a trainer at Fulham in July 1925, a position he remained in until 1927.

International career
In February 1913, while still with Barnsley, Utley was selected to play for England against Ireland. England were defeated 2–1, Ireland's first victory over England; He was not selected to play for England again. This remains the only full international appearance by a Barnsley player.

Football Legacy
It could be argued that Utley's greatest impact on the game of football in England was that regarding the award of testimonial and benefit games. Usually players were awarded a benefit game for long service and allowed to choose a match, excluding derby games and large visiting clubs, from which to receive the gate receipts as recognition of their services.

Utley challenged this in 1920 and was granted a benefit match against the then mighty Sunderland after only being at the club for four years, eventually receiving around £1,000. The board had been willing to make an exception for Utley, citing his importance to the team and wishing to ensure he stayed with the club.

This extraordinary move by the club caused unrest in the dressing room and nine of the first team signed a letter to the United directors, written by Billy Gillespie, complaining that this preferential treatment was unfair. The game went ahead a few days later without Utley although ironically Billy Gillespie scored twice in a 3–1 win in front of over 36,000 spectators. Utley stayed at Bramall Lane for another two years.

The Football League discovered the unrest this benefit had caused at the club and changed the rules governing such matches. They stipulated that testimonials could only be played after an agreed period of time stated within a players contract when agreed or upon their career being unexpectedly cut short. This ruling remains to this day.

Life outside football
Utley worked as an assistant cricket coach at Rossall School from 1911 until 1931 and from 1929 until 1931 he also worked as assistant groundsman.

Regarded as astute in financial matters, Utley married into a wealthy family following the death of his first wife. Having no children from either marriage he returned his second wife's money to her family upon her death claiming he had enough to keep him. Living in a large house he kept two housekeepers to whom he bequeathed a home on the estate for peppercorn rent upon his death.
During the later part of his football career he authored articles for boys magazines including:

Football by Prominent Players: "Captaining the Cup-Winners", The Boys' Friend Feb, 14 1920
"The Complete Half-Back", The Boys' Realm, 20 Mar 1920

Utley died in January 1966.

Career statistics

Club

Honours
Barnsley
FA Cup: 1911–12; runner-up: 1909–10

Sheffield United
FA Cup: 1914–15

References

1887 births
1966 deaths
English footballers
England international footballers
Barnsley F.C. players
Sheffield United F.C. players
Manchester City F.C. players
People from Elsecar
English Football League players
English Football League representative players
Footballers from Yorkshire
Sheffield Wednesday F.C. players
Association football wing halves
English carpenters
FA Cup Final players